The Egyptiotes, also known as Egyptian Greeks, have existed from the Hellenistic period until the aftermath of the Egyptian coup d'état of 1952, when most were forced to leave.

Antiquity
Greeks have been present in Egypt since at least the 7th century BC. Herodotus visited ancient Egypt in the 5th century BC and claimed that the Greeks were one of the first groups of foreigners that ever lived there. Diodorus Siculus claimed that Rhodian Actis, one of the Heliadae, built the city of Heliopolis before the cataclysm; likewise the Athenians built Sais. Siculus reports that all the Greek cities were destroyed during the cataclysm, but the Egyptian cities including Heliopolis and Sais survived.

First historical colonies
According to Herodotus (ii. 154), King Psammetichus I (664–610 BC) established a garrison of foreign mercenaries at Daphnae, mostly Carians and Ionian Greeks.

In 7th century BC, after the Greek Dark Ages from 1100 to 750 BC, the city of Naucratis was founded in Ancient Egypt. It was located on the Canopic branch of the Nile river, 45 mi (72 km) from the open sea. It was the first and, for much of its early history, the only permanent Greek colony in Egypt; acting as a symbiotic nexus for the interchange of Greek and Egyptian art and culture.

At about the same time, the city of Heracleion, the closest to the sea, became an important port for Greek trade. It had a famous temple of Heracles. The city later sank into the sea, only to be rediscovered recently.

From the time of Psammetichus I onwards, Greek mercenary armies played an important role in some of the Egyptian wars. One such army was led by Mentor of Rhodes. Another such personage was Phanes of Halicarnassus.

Hellenistic times

Rule of Alexander the Great (332–323 BC)
Alexander the Great conquered Egypt at an early stage of his conquests. He respected the pharaonic religions and customs and he was proclaimed Pharaoh of Egypt. He established the city of Alexandria. After his death, in 323 BC, his empire was divided among his generals. Egypt was given to Ptolemy I Soter, whose descendants would give Egypt her final royal dynasty – a glittering one. The dynasty was composed solely by ethnic Greeks and produced dynasts such as the famous Cleopatra. Its capital was Alexandria. Ptolemy added legitimacy to his rule in Egypt by acquiring Alexander's body. He intercepted the embalmed corpse on its way to burial, brought it to Egypt, and placed it in a golden coffin in Alexandria. It would remain one of the famous sights of the town for many years, until probably destroyed in riots in the 3rd century AD.

The Ptolemaic dynasty (323–30 BC) 

The initial objective of Ptolemy's reign was to establish firm and broad boundaries to his newly acquired kingdom. That led to almost continuous warfare against other leading members of Alexander's circle. At times he held Cyprus and even parts of mainland Greece. When these conflicts were over, he was firmly in control of Egypt and had strong claims (disputed by the Seleucid dynasty) to Palestine. He called himself king of Egypt from 306 BC. By the time he abdicated in 285 BC, in favour of one of his sons, the Ptolemaic dynasty was secure. Ptolemy and his descendants showed respect to Egypt's most cherished traditions – those of religion – and turned them to their own advantage.

Alexandria became the centre of the Greek and Hellenistic world and the centre of international commerce, art and science. The Lighthouse of Alexandria was one of the Seven Wonders of the Ancient World while during the reign of Ptolemy II Philadelphus, the Library of Alexandria was the biggest library in the world until it was destroyed. The last Pharaoh was a Greek princess, Cleopatra VII, who took her own life in 30 BC, a year after the battle of Actium.

Roman and Byzantine Egypt

Under Greco-Roman rule, Egypt hosted several Greek settlements, mostly concentrated in Alexandria, but also in a few other cities, where Greek settlers lived alongside some seven to ten million native Egyptians. Faiyum's earliest Greek inhabitants were soldier-veterans and cleruchs (elite military officials) who were settled by the Ptolemaic kings on reclaimed lands. Native Egyptians also came to settle in Faiyum from all over the country, notably the Nile Delta, Upper Egypt, Oxyrhynchus and Memphis, to undertake the labor involved in the land reclamation process, as attested by personal names, local cults and recovered papyri. It is estimated that as much as 30 percent of the population of Faiyum was Greek during the Ptolemaic period, with the rest being native Egyptians. By the Roman period, much of the "Greek" population of Faiyum was made up of either Hellenized Egyptians or people of mixed Egyptian-Greek origins. By the time of Roman emperor Caracalla in the 2nd century CE, "genuine" ethnic Egyptians could be easily differentiated from Alexandria's Greeks "by their speech."

While commonly believed to represent Greek settlers in Egypt, the Fayum mummy portraits instead reflect the complex synthesis of the predominant Egyptian culture and that of the elite Greek minority in the city. According to Walker, the early Ptolemaic Greek colonists married local women and adopted Egyptian religious beliefs, and by Roman times, their descendants were viewed as Egyptians by the Roman rulers, despite their own self-perception of being Greek. The dental morphology of the Roman-period Faiyum mummies was also compared with that of earlier Egyptian populations, and was found to be "much more closely akin" to that of ancient Egyptians than to Greeks or other European populations. Victor J. Katz notes that "research in papyri dating from the early centuries of the common era demonstrates that a significant amount of intermarriage took place between the Greek and Egyptian communities".

Medieval Islamic and Ottoman era

Greek culture and political influence continued and perhaps reached some of its most influential times during the Ottoman Caliphate, which witnessed many Ottoman Sultans and Pashas of Greek ancestry rule over the Ottoman Empire in general, and Egypt in particular. Other notable Greeks in Egypt during the Ottoman period included Damat Hasan Pasha from the Morea, a governor of Egypt. Raghib Pasha, born in Greece to Greek parents, served as Prime Minister of Egypt. During the Ottoman Caliphate, Pargalı Ibrahim Pasha, Grand Vizier to Suleiman the Magnificent from 1520 to 1566, is perhaps the best known.

Many Greek Muslims from Crete (often confusingly called Cretan Turks) were resettled in Egypt, Libya, Lebanon, and Syria by Sultan Abdul Hamid II after the Greco-Turkish War of 1897 that resulted in the autonomy of Crete (see the example of al-Hamidiyah, a largely Cretan Greek Muslim village in Syria).

Modern times

Greek community
In 1920, approximately 200,000 Greeks lived in Egypt. By c. 1940, the Greeks numbered about 300,000. The Greek community in Alexandria lived around the church and convent of Sabbas the Sanctified. In the same area there was a guest house for Greek travelers, a Greek hospital and later a Greek school. The Greek Orthodox bishop was based in Damietta in the church of Nikolaos of Myrna.

In Cairo, the first organised Greek community was founded in 1856, with the community based in three main neighbourhoods: Tzouonia, Haret el Roum (Street of the Greeks), and in Hamzaoui. The patriarchate was based in Saint Nicholas Greek Orthodox Cathedral, Hamzaoui. The monastery of Saint George, in Old Cairo still survives. The monastery is surrounded by a huge wall and topped by a stone tower. Within its walls there was a Greek hospital, a school and housing for the elderly and poor.

In addition to the Greek communities of Alexandria and Cairo, there were the organised Greek communities of Mansoura, founded in 1860, Port Said, founded in 1870, Tanta in 1880, and the community of Zagazig in 1850. There were fifteen smaller communities across Egypt and mainly around Cairo and Alexandria. In Upper Egypt, the oldest ancient Greek community was the one of Minia which was founded in 1812.

The first banks in Egypt were crafted by Greeks, including the Bank of Alexandria, the Anglo-Egyptian bank (Sunadinos family / Συναδινός), and the General Bank of Alexandria. Also, it was the Greek agriculturists and farmers that first systematically and with scientific planning, cultivated cotton and tobacco. They improved the quantity and quality of production and dominated cotton and tobacco exports. Notable families in tobacco commerce were the Salvagos, Benakis, Rodochanakis and Zervoudachis. The tobacco cultivars used for cigarette manufacturing, e.g., by Kyriazi Freres, were of Greek origin. A thriving commerce between Greece and Egypt was thus established. Other areas of interest for the Greeks in Egypt were foods, wine, soap, wood crafts, printing.

In the food industry, the macaroni industries of Melachrinos and Antoniadis were well known. Another example was the cheese and butter production of Argyriou, Roussoglou (Ρ) and Paleoroutas. Chocolate-Biscuits and Toffee producers were: Daloghlou, Russos, Repapis; Oil-soaps-vegetable fats (Salt & Soda) producers like Zerbinis were based in Kafr al-Zayat. There were many Greek theatres and cinemas. Major Greek newspapers were Ta grammata, "Tahidromos"(), and Nea Zoi. The Greek community in Egypt has produced numerous artists, writers, diplomats and politicians, the most famous being the poet Constantine P. Cavafy, also the painter Konstantinos Parthenis.

During the Balkan Wars, the Greek communities of Egypt sent volunteers, funded hospitals, and accommodated families of the soldiers. During World War II (1940–1945), more than 7000 Greeks fought for the Allies in the Middle East; 142 died. Their financial contribution reached 2500 million Egyptian pounds. After the Suez Crisis, the British and French laborers left while the Greeks stayed.

Patriarchate of Alexandria

Greek-Egyptian benefactors

The emergence of a Greek aristocracy of rich industrialists, commercants and bankers created the legacy of Greek-Egyptian philanthropism. These benefactors donated large amounts for the building of schools, academies, hospitals and institutions in both Egypt and Greece. Michail Tositsas donated large amounts for the building of the Athens University, the Amalio Orphanage and the Athens Polytechnic. His wife Eleni Tositsa donated the land for the National Archaeological Museum of Athens. George Averoff also contributed to the building of the National Technical University of Athens, the Evelpidon Military Academy and the donation of the cruiser Averoff to the Hellenic Navy. Emmanouil Benakis contributed to the building of the National Gallery of Athens, while his son Antonis Benakis was the founder of the Benaki Museum. Other major benefactors include Nikolaos Stournaras, Theodoros Kotsikas, Nestoras Tsanaklis, Konstantinos Horemis, Stefanos Delta, Penelope Delta, Pantazis Vassanis and Vassilis Sivitanidis.

Exodus

The exodus of Greeks from Egypt started before the coup d'état of 1952. With the establishment of the new sovereign regime of Gamal Abdel Nasser, rise of Pan-Arab nationalism, and the subsequent nationalisation of many industries in 1961 and 1963, thousands of Greek employees decided to emigrate. Many of them emigrated to Australia, the United States, Canada, South Africa, Western Europe, and Greece. Many Greek schools, churches, small communities and institutions subsequently closed, but many continue to function to this day. The Nasser regime saw a big exodus of the Greeks from Egypt, but most of the minority left the country either before or after the period 1952–1970. The Arab-Israeli wars of 1956 and 1967 contributed to the uprooting of the sizeable Greek community in the Suez Canal cities, especially Port Said.

Today
Today the Greek community numbers officially about 5,000 people, with independent estimates ranging to 60,000. Many of Greek origin are now counted as Egyptian, having changed their nationality. In Alexandria, apart from the Patriarchate, there is a Patriarchal theology school that opened recently after 480 years being closed. Saint Nicholas church in Cairo and several other buildings in Alexandria have been recently renovated by the Greek Government and the Alexander S. Onassis Foundation. Saint George's church in Old Cairo is undergoing restoration to end in 2014. During the last decade, there has been a new interest from the Egyptian government for a diplomatic rapprochement with Greece and this has positively affected the Greek Diaspora. The Diaspora has received official visits of many Greek politicians.  Economic relationships between Greece and Egypt have expanded.  As of 2010, Egypt has received major Greek investments in banking, tourism, paper, the oil industry, & many others. In 2009, a five-year cooperation-memorandum was signed among the NCSR Demokritos Institute in Agia Paraskevi, Athens and the University of Alexandria, regarding Archeometry research and contextual sectors.

Notable Greeks from Egypt
Greeks of Cyrene (the Cyrenaica is a region corresponding to modern eastern Libya) are also included, as during antiquity it held close relations to the Egyptian kingdoms, and at some points, also used to be a part of the Ptolemaic Kingdom. The presence of an asterisk (*) next to a person's name denotes that the person was born outside of Egypt, however the most part of this person's life or most important work occurred while in Egypt.

Dimos Starenios
theater-cinema actor 
born 15 Sept 1909 Cairo
died 23 Oct 1983 Athens

See also

 Demographics of Egypt
 Egyptian-Greek relations
 Kyriazi freres

References

Sources

External links
 The Greek community of Alexandria official website
 Egyptian Hellenism Department-Hellenic Literary and Historical Archive
 Greeks in Egypt-Greek communities Blog
 Pyramis - online newspaper of the Greek community in Egypt
 Collection of Books and Documents concerning Greeks in Egypt - ANEMI The Digital Library of University of Crete

Ethnic groups in Egypt
Egyptian people of Greek descent
Egypt
Greek diaspora in Africa
 
Greek Orthodoxy in Egypt